This is a non-fiction and fiction bibliography of the Bangladesh Liberation War.

Non-fiction

Major General (Retd.) Shubid Ali Bhuiyan
 মুক্তি যুদ্ধে নয় মাস (First edition June 1972)

Akhtaruddin Ahmed
 Nationalism or Islam

M.Hamidullah Khan
 Ekatture Uttar Ronangon Vol.I & II
 Bangaleer Muktijuddher Potobhumi

Jahanara Imam
 Ekatturer Dinguli
 Buker Vitor Agun
 Biday De Ma Ghure Ashi
 Of Blood And Fire

Prof Abul Barkat 
 An Inquiry into Causes and Consequences of Deprivation of Hindu Minorities in Bangladesh through the Vested Property Act: Framework for a Realistic Solution 
 Deprivation of Hindu Minority in Bangladesh: Living with Vested Property (Published English and Bengali languages 2008, 2009)

Abdul Gaffar Choudhury
 Etihasher Rokto Polash
 Amra Bangladeshi Na Bangali
 Bangladesh Kotha Koy

Abdur Rouf Choudhury
 Shayattyashason, Shadhikar O Shadhinota
 1971 Vol I
 1971 Vol II
 Ekti Jatike Hotya
 Smrite Ekattur

Selina Hosain
 Hangor Nodi Grenade
 Ekatturer Dhaka
 Japitu Jibon
 Nirontor Ghontabidhan

Panna Kaysar
 Muktijuddher Aage O Pore
 Hridoye Bangladesh

Sezan Mahmud
 Operation Jackpot
 Muktijudhdher Shera Lorai

Rishad Xaman
 1971
 Jochna O Jononir Golpo
Aguner Poroshmoni(আগুনের পরশমণি)

Muhammed Zafar Iqbal
 Muktijuddher Itihash

Tahmima Anam
 The Good Muslim

Other authors
 Muyeedul Hasan - Muldhara '71
 Muntasir Mamun- Sei Shob Pakistani
 Gaziul Haq - Ebarer Songram Shadhinotar Songram
 Ahmad Mazhar - Bangalir Muktijuddher Itihash
 Ahmed Maola - Muktijuddher Sahitto
 Neelima Ibrahim - Ami Birongona Bolchi
 Anisur Rahman - Opohrito Bangladesh
 Rashid Haydar - Osohojog Andolon- '71, Purbapor
 Sirajul Islam Chaudhury - Bangali Kake Bole
 Ramendra Majumdar - Bangladesh Amar Bangladesh
 Sufia Kamal - Ekatturer Diary
 Asaduzzaman - Shadhinota Sangramer Potobhumi
 Guerrilla Theke Sommukh Juddhe-1,2 / গেরিলা থেকে সম্মুখ যুদ্ধে-১.২ - Mahbub Alam (মাহবুব আলম).
Blood, A. K. (2005). The cruel birth of Bangladesh: Memoirs of an American diplomat. Dhaka: University Press.
 Bass, Gary J. The Blood Telegram: Nixon, Kissinger, and a Forgotten Genocide. Vintage, 2014. 
 Bhattacharyya, S. K., Genocide in East Pakistan/Bangladesh: A Horror Story, A. Ghosh Publishers, 1988.
 Brownmiller, Susan: Against Our Will: Men, Women, and Rape, Ballantine Books, 1993.
 Rummel, R.J., Death By Government, Transaction Publishers, 1997.
 Hitchens, Christopher, The Trials of Henry Kissinger, Verso (2001).

Novels

Humayun Ahmed
 Joshna O Jononir Golpo
 1971
 Anil Bagchir Ekdin
 Aguner Parashmoni
 Shyamal Chhaya

Abdur Rouf Choudhury
 Natun Diganta Shamagra - 1, 2, 3.

Shahriyar Kabir
 Ekatturer Pather Dhare
 Ekatturer Jishu

Muhammed Zafar Iqbal
 Akash Bariye Dao
 Amar Bondhu Rashed
 Gramer Naam Kakondubi

Other authors
 Anisul Hoque - Ma

Juvenile novels

Selina Hossain
 Nitu, Pakhi O Muktijudhdho

Muhammed Zafar Iqbal
 Akash Bariye Dao
 Amar Bondhu Rashed
 Gramer Naam Kakondubi

Sezan Mahmud
 Moner Ghuri Latai
 Kala Kuthuri
 Muktijuddher Sera Lorai
 Operation Jackpot

Short story collections
 Bangladesh Kotha Koy
 Prekhhapot 71
 Protibimbe Protiddondi
 Muktijuddher Golpo

English books
 Ataul karim - Bangladesh Rokter Reen
  Published before the end of the war, it contains little information on events after April 1971.
 Biplob roy - Bangladesh At War
 SIDDIQUE SALIK  - Witness to Surrender
 Ahmad Sharif (Edited) - Genocide 71

Uncategorized

Shawkat Osman
 Kalratro Khondochitro
 Joy Banglar Joy
 Jolangi
 Jahannam Hote Biday
 Jonmo Jodi Tobo Bonge
 Dui Soinik
 Nekre Oronno
 Shiekher Sombora

M. R. Akhtar Mukul
 Ekatturer Bornomala
 Ora Charjon
 Joybangla
 Bijoy
 Ekattur
 Ami Bijoy Dekhechi

Abul Hasanat
 Muktijuddher Ruprekha
 Muktijuddher Pachali

Rabeya Khatun
 Ferari Surjo
 Ekatturer Nishan

Momtaj Uddin Ahmad
 Saat Ghater Kanakori
 Bokul Purer Shadhinota

Other authors
 Syed Shamsul Haque - Nishiddho Loban
 Begum Nurjahan - Ekatturer Kothamala
 Abdullah Al Mamun - Tomrai
 Ashraf Siddiqi - Banglar Mukh
 Musa Sadiq - Muktijuddho Hridoye Momo
 Sayed Ali Ahsan - Jokhon Somoy Elo
 Rabindra Gop - Juddho Joyer Golpo
 Shirin Majid - Abar Asibo Feere
 Ali Imam - Lorai
 Biprodash Barua - Juddho Joyer Golpo
 Monju Sarkar - Juddhe Jabar Somoy
 Daud Hayder - Rajputra
 Monayem Sarkar - Bangladesh O Bongobondhu
 Jubayda Gulshan Ara - Batashe Barud Rokte Ullash
 Abu Hanif - Muktijoddha Hatem Ali
 Abul Kalam Azad - Sangramee Bangla
 Manjur Ahmad - Ekattur Kotha Bole
 Mamunur Rashid - Joy Joyonti
Alo Adharer Akattor - Serazul Quader published by Ghasphul

References

Bengali-language literature
Books on Liberation War
Liberation War of Bangladesh
Lists of mass media in Bangladesh
Aftermath of the Bangladesh Liberation War